Bohumil Kubát (14 February 1935 – 12 May 2016) was a wrestler who competed for Czechoslovakia. He won an Olympic bronze medal in Greco-Roman wrestling in 1960. He competed at the 1964 Olympics, where he placed fourth in Freestyle wrestling.

References

External links
 

1935 births
2016 deaths
Czechoslovak male sport wrestlers
Olympic wrestlers of Czechoslovakia
Wrestlers at the 1960 Summer Olympics
Wrestlers at the 1964 Summer Olympics
Czech male sport wrestlers
Olympic bronze medalists for Czechoslovakia
Olympic medalists in wrestling
Medalists at the 1960 Summer Olympics